Barbara Damrosch (born in 1942) is a professional in the field of horticulture, a writer, and co-owner of the Four Season Farm. She was educated at the Brearley School, Wheaton College in Massachusetts, and Columbia University, where she earned a PhD in English Literature. From 1979 to 1992, she was the owner of a company by the name of Barbara Damrosch Landscape Design. She operated this company in Washington, Connecticut. Her book The Garden Primer is a classic manual of horticulture. She and her husband, Eliot Coleman, operate an experimental market garden in Maine. This garden produces food year-round and is a model of small-scale sustainable agriculture.

Her publications include The Garden Primer, Theme Gardens, and a yearly garden calendar started in 1992. For several years, she and Coleman co-hosted the TV series Gardening Naturally.

References

External links
 Four Season Farm (archive)

American horticulturists
1942 births
Living people
Wheaton College (Massachusetts) alumni